Rick Leach and Jim Pugh defeated Sergio Casal and Emilio Sánchez in the final, 6–4, 6–3, 2–6, 6–0 to win the doubles tennis title at the 1988 Masters Grand Prix.

Tomáš Šmíd and Miloslav Mečíř were the reigning champions, but did not compete this year.

Draw

Finals

Group A
Standings are determined by: 1. number of wins; 2. number of matches; 3. in two-players-ties, head-to-head records; 4. in three-players-ties, percentage of sets won, or of games won; 5. steering-committee decision.

Group B
Standings are determined by: 1. number of wins; 2. number of matches; 3. in two-players-ties, head-to-head records; 4. in three-players-ties, percentage of sets won, or of games won; 5. steering-committee decision.

External links
Rick Leach Doubles-1988 from ATP
Sergio Casal Doubles-1988 from ATP
Pieter Aldrich Doubles-1988 from ATP
Marty Davis Doubles-1988 from ATP
Kelly Evernden Doubles-1988 from ATP
Jorge Lozano Doubles-1988 from ATP

Doubles